The  Green Bay Packers season was the franchise's 94th season overall and their 92nd in the National Football League, and the seventh under head coach Mike McCarthy. The Packers won the NFC North division title for the second year in a row with an 11–5 record. The Packers lost in the Divisional round of the playoffs to the eventual NFC Champion San Francisco 49ers by the score of 45–31, finishing with a postseason record of 1–1.
The Packers offense finished the season fifth in points and eleventh in yards per game. The defense finished eleventh in points allowed and twenty-second in yards allowed per game.

Offseason

Notes:

The Packers acquired the No. 224 selection in a trade that sent guard Caleb Schlauderaff to the New York Jets.
The  Packers received the maximum number of compensatory selections available to teams through the NFL's compensatory draft program. Two additional picks in both the 4th and 7th rounds.
The Packers traded No. 59 and No. 123 picks to receive No. 51 from the Philadelphia Eagles.
The Packers traded No. 90 and No. 163 picks to receive No. 62 from the New England Patriots .
The Packers traded No. 197, No. 224 and No. 235 picks to receive No. 163 back from the New England Patriots .

Free agents

RFA: Restricted free agent, UFA: Unrestricted free agent, ERFA: Exclusive rights free agent, FT: Franchise Tag

Additions

On January 1 the Packers signed QB Nick Hill.
On March 23 the Packers signed former Indianapolis Colts C Jeff Saturday.
On March 23 the Packers signed former Indianapolis Colts DE Daniel Muir.
On March 30 the Packers signed former Seattle Seahawks DE Anthony Hargrove.
On May 23 the Packers signed former Miami Dolphins DE Phillip Merling.
On August 12 the Packers signed former Cincinnati Bengals RB Cedric Benson.
On September 3 the Packers signed WR Diondre Borel, TE Brandon Bostick, QB B. J. Coleman, T Andrew Datko, DE Lawrence Guy, G/T Chris Scott, RB Marc Tyler and G Greg Van Roten to the practice squad.
On December 5 the Packers signed former Green Bay Packers RB Ryan Grant after placing Johnny White on injured reserve. They also signed T/G Shea Allard and S Chaz Powell to the practice squad.

Departures
On April 23 the Packers released T Chad Clifton after a failed physical.
On April 25 the Packers released S Nick Collins after agreeing to part ways after sustaining a career-ending neck injury in 2011.
On May 23 the Packers released QB Nick Hill.
On July 25 the Packers released S Charlie Peprah after a failed physical.
On August 24 the Packers released WR Andrew Brewer, DE Anthony Hargrove, S Micah Pellerin, T Herb Taylor and CB Dion Turner.
On August 26 the Packers released FB Jon Hoese and DE Jarius Wynn.
On August 31 the Packers released S Anthony Levine, CB Otis Merrill, WR Dale Moss, NT Daniel Muir, RB Marc Tyler, G Greg Van Roten, G Reggie Wells, T Shea Allard, WR Diondre Borel, TE Brandon Bostick, QB B. J. Coleman, FB Nic Cooper, T Andrew Datko, C Tommie Draheim, C Sampson Genus, WR Curenski Gilleylen, WR Tori Gurley and DE Lawrence Guy as part of the cutdown to the 53-man regular season roster.

Coaching changes
On January 21, Packers offensive coordinator Joe Philbin was named the new head coach of the Miami Dolphins.
On February 2, Packers quarterbacks coach Tom Clements was promoted to the team's offensive coordinator position.

Final roster

Regular season

Regular-season transactions

Starters on offense

Starters on defense and special teams

Schedule

Preseason

Regular season

Note: Intra-division opponents are in bold text.

Postseason

Standings

Regular-season results

Week 1: vs. San Francisco 49ers

After finishing last season with a league best 15–1 record, the Green Bay Packers began their 2012 campaign against the San Francisco 49ers who finished second to the Packers in the NFC with a 13–3 record. San Francisco delivered the game's opening punch in the first quarter as David Akers converted a 40-yard field goal. The 49ers further extended their lead when veteran WR Randy Moss (who had joined the 49ers after spending a year in retirement) caught a 17-yard pass in the middle of the end zone from Alex Smith in the 2nd quarter. The Packers scored their first points of the season when Aaron Rodgers connected with TE Jermichael Finley in the center of the endzone on a 1-yard pass. Rodgers and the Packers offense struggled to move the ball and David Akers added two more field goals for the 49ers including a long distance 63-yard field goal that hit the cross bar and bounced through as the 1st half came to an end. The Packers went into the locker room down 16–7.
The 49ers continued their scoring in the third quarter with Vernon Davis hauling in a 4-yard pass in the end zone from Alex Smith to further extend the 49ers lead to 23–7. The Packers' managed to chip into the 49ers lead when WR Randall Cobb returned a punt 75 yards for a touchdown. Rodgers completed a pass to Jordy Nelson for the 2-point conversion to bring the lead down to a more manageable 8-point lead.  However, Rodgers threw a costly interception to LB NaVorro Bowman on the Packers next offensive possession which set up the 49ers with great field position. Following the INT, RB Frank Gore scored a touchdown on a 23-yard scamper into the endzone down the right sideline. The Packers drove down and Rodgers completed a 10-yard touchdown pass to James Jones to bring the Packers within 8 points for the second time with a little over 6 minutes remaining in the game. The Packers forced the 49ers to punt with 3:45 remaining on the clock but hope expired on a come from behind victory when Rodgers failed to complete an attempted pass to Jordy Nelson on 4th and 10. The 49ers regained possession and ran out the game clock.
With the loss, Green Bay began their season 0–1 matching the Packers regular season losses for all of the 2011 season. Also, this game ended their streak of 13 consecutive regular season victories at Lambeau Field.

Week 2: vs. Chicago Bears

With the win, the Packers improved to 1–1.

Week 3: at Seattle Seahawks

With the controversial loss, the Packers fell to 1–2. Also, QB Aaron Rodgers would be held without a touchdown for the first time since the teams' 9–0 shutout against the Jets during the 2010 season. The team was also one of six 2011 playoff teams to be under .500 after their first three games.

Week 4: vs. New Orleans Saints

In spite of the surprising loss to the Seahawks, the Packers returned home for a game against the Saints. The Saints tried to avenge their losing in Green Bay last season. However, the Packers would win this game and improve to 2–2 while the Saints dropped to 0–4.

Week 5: at Indianapolis Colts

The Packers went to Indianapolis for a game against the Colts. Despite the fact that the team was up 21–3 at halftime, the Colts erased the lead in the 2nd half and won the game 30–27. This dropped the Packers' record to 2–3 on the season, 0–1 against the AFC South, and 0–4 all-time in Indianapolis.

Week 6: at Houston Texans

With the victory over the previously undefeated Texans, the Packers improved their season to 3–3 and 5–0 all-time in the city of Houston. Aaron Rodgers tied the franchise record with 6 touchdown passes. Before the game the Texans defense only allowed 6 touchdowns all season.

Week 7: at St. Louis Rams

The Packers traveled to St. Louis to take on the Rams.  The game was unfortunately close unlike the previous season's 24–3 blowout win but the Packers would end up winning 30–20 while improving to 4–3.

Week 8: vs. Jacksonville Jaguars

With their third consecutive win, the Packers improved to 5–3, dropping to the Jacksonville Jaguars to 1–1 at Lambeau Field. The Kansas City Chiefs and Houston Texans are now the only two remaining teams which have never lost at Lambeau, sitting at 3–0 and 1–0, respectively.

Week 9: vs. Arizona Cardinals

The Packers head into their bye week 6–3 after 4 touchdown passes by Aaron Rodgers. The Packers gained 176 yards rushing, the most by the Packers in a game since 2009 vs the Cleveland Browns. The Arizona Cardinals drop to 0–7 all-time at Lambeau Field after losing their fifth consecutive game.

Week 11: at Detroit Lions

With their win on the other side of Lake Michigan against the longtime rival Detroit Lions, Green Bay improved to 7–3 and set a franchise record of nine straight regular season victories over their three division rivals, dating back to Week 17 of their 2010 season.

Week 12: at New York Giants

After winning against the Lions, the Packers traveled on the road to take on the Giants, who eliminated them from the playoffs last season 37–20. The Packers were overpowered as they would lose 38–10 and dropped to 7–4 on the season. With the Bears win earlier in the day, the Packers now sit in 2nd place in the NFC North.

Week 13: vs. Minnesota Vikings

With their home victory over their bitter rival from Minnesota, the Packers won their fifth consecutive game against the Vikings and franchise-record tenth straight matchup against a division rival. Vikings RB Adrian Peterson was a major threat during the first half, and as a result the Vikings led 14–10 at halftime. However, the Packers were able to score 13 unanswered points in the second half and keep the Vikings in check for the remainder of the game, thereby winning 23–14 and dropping their rival to 6–6.

Upon winning, the team improved to 8–4 and retook the lead in the NFC North after the rival Chicago Bears lost to the Seattle Seahawks at home in overtime. This would also be the last time Rodgers would throw an interception at a home game until Week 5 of the 2015 season.

The Packers look to continue their division dominance by trying to extend their winning streak in Wisconsin against the Lions to 22 straight games (including the 1994 playoffs) on Sunday Night Football during Week 14.

Week 14 vs. Detroit Lions

The Packers fell behind Detroit 14–0, but regained momentum when defensive lineman Mike Daniels returned a Lions fumble 43 yards for a touchdown, helping to put the Packers down only 14–10 at halftime. On their opening drive of the second half, Aaron Rodgers gave the Packers the lead for the first time with a 27-yard touchdown run. The Lions would tie the game 17–17 on a Jason Hanson field goal, and after both the Packers and the Lions would both miss field goals, the Packers finally got the lead for good on a 14-yard touchdown run by rookie DuJuan Harris. A Mason Crosby field goal gave the Packers a sure 27–17 lead with just over 4 minutes left in the game. The Lions would kick a field goal with 7 seconds left, but failed the onside kick attempt, giving the Packers a 27–20 win and eliminating the Lions from playoff contention. With a win against the rival Bears the following week, the Packers had the opportunity to clinch the NFC North division.

Will Ferrell was in attendance and led the crowd in a rendition of "Roll Out the Barrel".

Week 15: at Chicago Bears

The Packers fell behind 7–0 to the Bears early in the 2nd quarter, but three consecutive Aaron Rodgers touchdown passes to James Jones gave the Packers a 21–7 lead midway through the third quarter. The Bears would pull to within 8 points late by way of two Olindo Mare field goals, but the Bears couldn't mount a comeback.  
With the 21–13 win, the Packers clinched the NFC North division title for a second season in a row and secured a playoff berth for the fourth consecutive season.

Week 16: vs. Tennessee Titans

 
With the win in their regular season home finale, the Packers improved to 11–4 on the season, 7–1 at home, and 3–1 against the AFC South by winning their first game against Tennessee since 1998, the final year the AFC franchise was referred to as the Oilers.

Week 17: at Minnesota Vikings

With a 37–34 loss to the Vikings, the Packers failed to clinch the #2 overall seed in the NFC and a first round bye while finishing 11–5. The Packers loss set up a playoff re match between the Packers and the Vikings in the wild-card round of the playoffs. The Packers held Vikings RB Adrian Peterson 9 yards short of breaking the NFL regular season rushing record (2105 yards). The Packers' 12-game winning streak against division rivals was snapped as they lost their first game vs. a rival since their 7–3 loss to the Lions in Week 14 of the 2010 season. Also, the loss to the Vikings killed the Packers' chance of having a perfect record against division rivals for the second season in a row, as well as losing their 5-game winning streak vs. the Vikings.

Postseason (Playoffs)

By virtue of clinching the NFC North division title the Packers hosted a playoff game in the wild-card round. The Packers win against the Titans in Week 16 guaranteed at least the 3rd seed in the NFC; However, the Packers fell short of the #2 seed and a first round bye by failing to win in Week 17 over the Vikings.

NFC Wildcard Round: vs. Minnesota Vikings

Despite trailing early in the first quarter, the Packers were able to score 24 unanswered points due to a Vikings defense demotivated by a bad performance from Vikings backup quarterback Joe Webb (starter Christian Ponder was injured in regular season finale). The Packers got their first playoff win since 2010 and first home playoff victory since 2007.

NFC Divisional Playoff Game: at San Francisco 49ers

With the loss, the Packers ended their season with an overall record of 12–6. This marked the final game for longtime wide receiver Donald Driver, who announced his retirement after the season.

Staff

Statistics

Regular season statistical leaders

 statistical values are correct through Week 17.

Best game performances

 statistical values are correct through Week 17.

Statistical league rankings
Total Offense (YPG): 13th
Passing (YPG): 10th
Rushing (YPG): 20th
Points (PPG): 7th
Total Defense (YPG): 10th
Passing (YPG):12th
Rushing (YPG): 14th
Points (PPG): 7th

Stats correct through December 24, 2012

Awards and records

Awards

Weekly awards

P Tim Masthay was named NFC Special Teams Player of the Week for games played during Week 2. (vs. Bears)
QB Aaron Rodgers was named NFC Offensive Player of the Week for games played during Week 4. (vs. Saints)
QB Aaron Rodgers was named the winner of the Never Say Die moment of the week for games played during Week 4. (vs. Saints)
QB Aaron Rodgers was named NFC Offensive Player of the Week for games played during Week 6. (@ Texans)
CB Davon House was named NFC Special Teams Player of the Week for games played during Week 8. (vs. Jaguars)

Monthly awards

QB Aaron Rodgers was named NFC Offensive Player of the Month for the month of October.
CB Casey Hayward was named NFL Defensive Rookie of the Month for the month of October.

Records

Team

Game

Season

Individual

Game

QB Aaron Rodgers tied Matt Flynn for the Packers record of Most touchdown passes, game with 6 vs the Houston Texans.

Season

WR Randall Cobb set the Packers single-season record for all-purpose yards with 2,342 yards.

Career

QB Aaron Rodgers passed Bart Starr for second place on the Packers Career Touchdown Passes list in week 8 vs the Jacksonville Jaguars.
WR Donald Driver passed Bart Starr for second place on the Packers Career Games Played list in week 5 vs the Indianapolis Colts.

Notes and references

External links
Green Bay Packers official website

Green Bay
Green Bay Packers seasons
NFC North championship seasons
Green